The 2014 season for the  began in January with the Tour Down Under. As a UCI ProTeam, they were automatically invited and obligated to send a squad to every event in the UCI World Tour.

After Argos Oil withdrew sponsorship from the team at the end of the 2013 season, Taiwanese bicycle manufacturer Giant Bicycles took over main naming rights for the 2014 season.

Team roster

Riders who joined the team for the 2014 season

Riders who left the team during or after the 2013 season

Season victories

Footnotes

References

Giant Shimano
2014
Giant Shimano